Mohamed Taib (born 20 April 1994) is an Algerian footballer who plays as a midfielder for RC Arbaâ.

References

External links

1994 births
Living people
Association football midfielders
Algerian footballers
Algerian expatriate footballers
USM Alger players
RC Arbaâ players
CS Constantine players
DRB Tadjenanet players
AS Aïn M'lila players
Olympique de Médéa players
Al-Rawdhah Club players
Algerian Ligue Professionnelle 1 players
Saudi Second Division players
Algerian expatriate sportspeople in Saudi Arabia
Expatriate footballers in Saudi Arabia
21st-century Algerian people